FK Cetinje is a Montenegrin football club based in Cetinje. They currently compete in the Montenegrin Third League.

History 
Founded in 1975, Football club Cetinje started as a team of printing house Obod. So, the first name of the club was FK Štampar. From 1978, the team participated under the name FK Tara, and since 1991 its name changed to FK Cetinje. Club is coming from the town with strong football tradition, and their neighbouring FK Lovćen is the oldest Montenegrin sports club and member of Montenegrin First League.
First significant success, the team made in the 1980-81 season, by winning the champions' title in Fourth League - Southern region, gaining promotion to Montenegrin Republic League.
During the eighties and nineties, FK Cetinje spent seasons in third and fourth rank of domestic competition, but always in the shadow of the oldest city rival - FK Lovćen. 
After Montenegrin independence, FK Cetinje became a member of the Montenegrin Third League, where they spent three consecutive seasons. In the 2009-10 season, they won a title in Third League - Southern Region, but with defeats against FK Iskra and FK Pljevlja in playoffs didn't succeed to qualify for the Montenegrin Second League.
Historical success came in the 2012-13 season. FK Cetinje won another title in the Third League, but this time won the playoffs against FK Pljevlja and FK Kom. With that result, FK Cetinje for the first time gained promotion to the Second League. The First game in the Second League, they played on 18 August 2013 in Cetinje against FK Igalo (1:0). 
After two second-tier seasons spent in the middle of the table, FK Cetinje made notable success during the 2015-16 season. After autumn half-season, they finished as a leader of the Second League, but during the spring FK Cetinje lost a first-place struggle against FK Jedinstvo and finished second. With that result, FK Cetinje qualified for their first performance in the Montenegrin First League playoffs, where they met OFK Petrovac. After goalless draw on Cetinje, OFK Petrovac won second game (1-0), so FK Cetinje remained a member of the Second League.
After five consecutive seasons in Second League, FK Cetinje was relegated to bottom-tier in 2018. But, after three seasons spent in Third League - South, they made a comeback to higher level on season 2021-22.

Honours and achievements
 Montenegrin Second League – 0
runner-up (1): 2015–16
 Montenegrin Third League – 3
winners (2): 2009–10, 2012–13, 2020–21
 Montenegrin Fourth League – 5
winners (5): 1980–81, 1988–89, 1993–94, 1997–98, 2003–04
 Southern Region Cup – 1
winners (1): 2008
runner-up (2): 2010, 2012

Players

Current squad

Notable players
For the list of former players with Wikipedia article, please see :Category:FK Cetinje players.

Stadium 

FK Cetinje plays their home games at Stadion Sveti Petar Cetinjski. They are sharing the stadium with local rival FK Lovćen. The stadium has a capacity of 5,192 seats.

See also 
 Montenegrin Second League
 Football in Montenegro
 Montenegrin clubs in Yugoslav football competitions (1946–2006)
 Cetinje

References

Association football clubs established in 1975
Football clubs in Montenegro
1975 establishments in Montenegro
FK